The Zhengding Airport railway station is a station on the Beijing–Guangzhou–Shenzhen–Hong Kong high-speed railway. It is located in Xinchengpu Town in Zhengding County, Shijiazhuang, Hebei Province, near Shijiazhuang Zhengding International Airport.

History
The station was opened on 26 December 2012, together with the Beijing-Zhengzhou section of the Beijing–Guangzhou–Shenzhen–Hong Kong High-Speed Railway.

Passengers arriving to the airport by train and leaving by plane could have the cost of their train tickets reimbursed as well.
 Over 150,000 passengers used the promotion in 2013.

Location
Although named after the Shijiazhuang Zhengding International Airport, the station is not adjacent to the airport. Shuttle bus services are provided to connect the station with the airport, with a 3–5 min trip.

The travelling time to Beijing is around 1 hour to 1 hour 30 min.

Station layout
The station has 2 side platforms and 4 tracks. The station building, which houses ticket offices, waiting halls, restaurants, etc., is located to the north of the platforms.

References

Railway stations in Hebei
Airport railway stations in China
Railway stations in China opened in 2012